The 2021–22 Virginia Cavaliers men's basketball team represented the University of Virginia during the 2021–22 NCAA Division I men's basketball season. The team was led by head coach Tony Bennett in his 13th year and played their home games at John Paul Jones Arena in Charlottesville, Virginia, as members of the Atlantic Coast Conference.

The Cavaliers finished the season 21–14, 12–8 in ACC Play to finish in 6th place. They defeated Louisville in the Second Round of the ACC tournament before losing in the quarterfinals to North Carolina. They received an at-large bid to the National Invitation Tournament where they defeated Mississippi State and North Texas to advance to the quarterfinals where they lost to St. Bonaventure.

The Cavaliers did not qualify for the NCAA Tournament for the first time since 2012–13.

Previous season
In a season limited due to the ongoing COVID-19 pandemic, the Cavaliers finished the 2020–21 season 18–7, 13–4 in ACC play to win the regular season championship. They defeated Syracuse in the quarterfinals of the ACC tournament before they were forced to withdraw from the tournament due to COVID-19 issues. They received a bid to the NCAA tournament as the No. 4 seed in the West region where they were upset in the First Round by Ohio.

Offseason

Coaching changes

Departures

Incoming transfers

2021 recruiting class

^ESPN has not released their team rankings for 2021 yet.

Roster

Players

Coaches

Depth chart

Schedule and results

|-
!colspan=12 style=""| Scrimmage

 

|-
!colspan=12 style=""| Regular Season

|-
!colspan=12 style=""| ACC Tournament

|-
!colspan=12 style=""| NIT Tournament

Source

Rankings

*Coaches did not release a week 1 poll.

References

Virginia Cavaliers men's basketball seasons
Virginia
Virginia Cavaliers men's basketball
Virginia Cavaliers men's basketball team
Virginia